Mount Rumput (Gunung Rumput) is a mountain on the island of Borneo. It is 1590 metres tall and sits on the international border between Indonesia and Malaysia.

References
 Peakbagger listing

See also 
 List of Ultras of Malay Archipelago

Rumput
Rumput
Rumput
Indonesia–Malaysia border